Gasing pangkah is a competitive Malay game of spinning tops in which two or more players compete to strike each other's top out of a circle or to make it fall over and stop spinning.

Considered part of the Malay state heritage, official tournaments are held, with a declared goal of exposing the younger generation to the game.

The game is also popular in neighboring Brunei, and in 2013, a gasing pangkah tournament was held as part of the celebrations of the 67th birthday of the Sultan of Brunei.

See also
Pambaram

External links 
 Video from a Gasing Pangkah Tournament, Brunei

References 

Tabletop games
Tops